The Battle of Telay was a battle of the Eritrean War of Independence, and took place in mid-1963.   
  
In the battle, an Eritrean Liberation Front unit led by Omar Izaz was able to successfully ambush an Ethiopian Police Force heading from Gherger to Agordat, killing and capturing many prisoners, as well as capturing 17 guns.  
  
After being informed of the ELF's objectives, several of the captured policemen were released and joined the Eritrean Liberation Front.

References

Eritrean War of Independence
Battles involving Ethiopia
Battles involving Eritrea